The Shanghai Jewish Chronicle was a Jewish newspaper operating in Shanghai, China. It was a German language newspaper that was originally published daily and later published weekly.

The paper opened on May 3, 1939. The German language newspaper business was increasing in Shanghai due to an influx of Jewish refugees from Europe. Ossi Lewin, J. Kastan, and Horwitz served as the editors. The newspaper stories included international news and often referred to interests held by Jewish people. It targeted "Jews of the Far East and especially those of the German speaking community." It also discussed emigration problems. Each issue had eight to sixteen pages. Advertising made up about one third of each issue.

After the Japanese took over China, the Chronicle cooperated with the Japanese administration. It was the only Jewish newspaper in Shanghai to exist after World War II. In 1945 it was renamed Shanghai Echo. In 1948 publication ended.

See also

 Der Ostasiatische Lloyd
 Deutsche Shanghai Zeitung
 Shen Bao
 North China Daily News
 Shanghai Evening Post and Mercury
 Tsingtauer Neueste Nachrichten

References
 Eber, Irene (editor and translator). Voices from Shanghai: Jewish Exiles in Wartime China. University of Chicago Press, October 1, 2008. , 9780226181660.
 Goldstein, Jonathan. The Jews of China: Historical and Comparative Perspectives. M.E. Sharpe, 1999. , 9780765601032.
 Walravens, Hartmut. "German Influence on the Press in China." - In: Newspapers in International Librarianship: Papers Presented by the Newspaper Section at IFLA General Conferences. Walter de Gruyter, January 1, 2003. , 9783110962796.
Also available at (Archive) the website of the Queens Library - This version does not include the footnotes visible in the Walter de Gruyter version
Also available in Walravens, Hartmut and Edmund King. Newspapers in international librarianship: papers presented by the newspapers section at IFLA General Conferences. K.G. Saur, 2003. , 9783598218378.

Notes

External links

Further reading
 Rao, Lihua (S: 饶立华, T: 饒立華, P: Ráo Lìhuá). "《上海犹太纪事报》研究." ("Study of the Shanghai Jewish Chronicle") Xinhua Publishing House (S: 新华出版社, T: 新華出版社, P: Xīn Huá Chūbǎnshè), 2003. , 9787501161621.

German-language newspapers published in China
Jewish newspapers
1939 establishments in China
Newspapers established in 1939
Publications disestablished in 1948
Defunct newspapers published in China
Jews and Judaism in Shanghai
Newspapers published in Shanghai
1948 disestablishments in China